is the 15th-generation Grand Master (iemoto) of Urasenke, which is one of the most widely known schools of Japanese tea, and served in official capacity from 1964 to 2002. In 1949, he received the Zen title Hōunsai (鵬雲斎). Following his retirement, he has adopted the name Sen Genshitsu (玄室), with the honorary title Daisosho, in order to distinguish him from his son and successor, Sen Sōshitsu XVI. For over seven decades, Dr. Sen Genshitsu has traveled across the world in order to promote the ethos of "Peacefulness through a Bowl of Tea".

Early life 
Sen Genshitsu was born in Kyoto on 19 April 1923, the first son of the 14th-generation Urasenke iemoto (Sen Sōshitsu XIV, Mugensai Sekiso Sōshitsu (Tantansai), 1893-1964) and his wife, Kayoko (née Ito Kayoko).  Prior to his birth, Mugensai and Kayoko were already the parents of two daughters, Yaeko and Yoshiko. The birth of their first son, who would eventually become Mugensai's successor, occasioned much jubilation. Later, Mugensai and Kayoko begot two more sons, Yoshiharu and Mitsuhiko.

At birth, he was given the name Masaoki (政興) by his grandfather, the 13th-generation Urasenke iemoto (Sen Sōshitsu XIII, Ennōsai Tetchu Sōshitsu, 1872-1924). During World War II, Sen Masoaki served in the Japanese Navy airforce division, and was assigned to be a kamikaze pilot, but in order to prevent an old dynasty from dying out, he was not allowed to participate. He later completed his education at Doshisha University, graduating from the Faculty of Economics. He took Buddhist vows under Goto Zuigan, the chief abbot of Daitoku-ji temple, and in 1949, received the title Hōunsai.

Career and honors 
In 1950, confirmed as heir apparent, he began his many travels abroad to spread his ideas, starting in the United States, where he began his association with the University of Hawaiʻi. In 1953, he became president of the non-profit Urasenke membership organization, Tankokai. Upon his father's death in 1964, he officially succeeded as the 15th generation Urasenke iemoto. In the following decades, he has made many contributions to the international academic study of the history and culture of tea, and was awarded a Ph.D from the University of Hawaiʻi in 1983, Nankai University in 1991, and a Litt.D from Chung-Ang University in 2008.

Among positions outside of Urasenke, he currently heads the Consulate of Peru in Kyoto as Honorary Consul. He was Honorary Consul of Portugal in Kyoto from 1969 to 1982, and the Honorary Consul-General of Italy in Kyoto from 1982 to 1983. He served as Rotary International director from 1988 to 1990, and as a Rotary Foundation trustee from 1998 to 2002. He was appointed by Japan's Ministry of Foreign Affairs as Japan-U.N. Goodwill Ambassador in 2005, as well as Chairman of the Rotary Japan Foundation, President of the United Nations Association of Japan, President of the Kyoto City International Foundation, Director of the Kyoto Municipal General Center for Lifelong Learning, and President of the Japan Equestrian Federation. In March 2012, he was designated as UNESCO Goodwill Ambassador by the Director-General of UNESCO. In April 2017, he was appointed as an Advisor to the Minister for Foreign Affairs of Japan. 

In 1997, he was awarded the Order of Culture by the Emperor of Japan, Akihito, the first in the chado world to receive such an honor. In 2020, the French government awarded him with the Legion of Honour, with the degree of Commander.

Personal life and retirement 
His wife was Tomiko. In December 2002, his eldest son, Zabosai (born 7 June 1956), succeeded him as the 16th generation head of Urasenke, and inherited the name Sōshitsu. With that, Sen Sōshitsu XV discontinued his own use of the Sōshitsu name, taking on the name Sen Genshitsu, and the honorary title Daisosho, signifying his position as a former Grand Master.

References

External links

Greetings from SEN Genshitsu (Soshitsu XV)

1923 births
Living people
People from Kyoto
Japanese tea masters
Doshisha University alumni
Kamikaze pilots
Recipients of the Order of Culture
Recipients of the Order of the Rising Sun, 2nd class
Recipients of the Medal of Honor (Japan)
Officiers of the Légion d'honneur
Commanders Crosses of the Order of Merit of the Federal Republic of Germany
Recipients of the Order of Saints Maurice and Lazarus